Crooked Run is a tributary of Catawissa Creek in Schuylkill County, Pennsylvania, in the United States. The stream is considered to be a High-Quality Coldwater Fishery and Class A Wild Trout Waters. However, it is impaired by atmospheric deposition. The main rock formations in the stream's watershed are the Mauch Chunk Formation and the Pocono Formation and the main soils are the Leck Kill soil and the Hazleton soil.

Course
Crooked Run begins on Catawissa Mountain in North Union Township. It flows east-southeast for a few tenths of a mile before turning roughly east for some distance and eventually flowing off Catawissa Mountain. The stream then turns northeast and begins to skirt the edge of the mountain for more than a mile. It then turns north for a few tenths of a mile, crossing Raricks Road, before turning west and then north again, flowing parallel to Bunker Hill Road for a few tenths of a mile. Several tenths of a mile downstream, the stream reaches its confluence with Catawissa Creek, a few hundred feet from the border between Schuylkill County and Columbia County.

Tributaries
Crooked Run has one unnamed tributary.

Hydrology
The upper reaches of Crooked Run are considered by the Pennsylvania Fish and Boat Commission to be impaired for aquatic life by atmospheric deposition due to pH. The stream is infertile and acidic, with the potential to be affected by acidic precipitation. The pH of the stream ranges from 5.8 to 6.6 and the concentration of alkalinity ranges from 3 to 5 milligrams per liter.

Geography and geology

The upper reaches of Crooked Run are on rock of the Pocono Formation, which dates to the Mississippian Period. The rest of the stream flows over rock of the Mauch Chunk Formation. The lower reaches of the stream are on Leck Kill soil and the upper reaches are on Hazleton soil.

Crooked Run is a small stream, with a width of 2.9 meters (9.5 feet). It has a high gradient of 39.3 meters per kilometer.

Watershed
Most of the watershed is in North Union Township. However, a substantial portion of it is in northern Union Township and a small portion is in southeastern Roaring Creek Township, Columbia County. The stream flows through agricultural land in its lower half. There are also forested lands in the watershed.

Crooked Run is in the United States Geological Survey quadrangles of Shumans and Nuremberg. The watershed is part of the Lower North Branch Susquehanna drainage basin.

22 percent of the length of Crooked Run is within  of a road. 49 percent of the stream's length is within  of a road and 65 percent is within  of one. In 1990, the population density of the watershed was 22 people per square kilometer.

Biology
Crooked Run is considered by the Pennsylvania Department of Environmental Protection to be a High-Quality Coldwater Fishery. It is considered by the Pennsylvania Fish and Boat Commission to be Class A Wild Trout Waters between its headwaters and its mouth.

In a survey 1997, their biomass at this location was measured to be 106.48 kilograms per hectare, which was the highest wild trout biomass of any tributary of Catawissa Creek observed during the survey. Brook trout less than 175 millimeters long make up 74.12 kilograms per hectare and brook trout more than 175 millimeters long make up 32.36 kilograms per hectare. The lengths of the trout in the stream range from 25 to 224 millimeters.

There are 2315 brook trout per kilometer on Crooked Run, of which 2215 are less than 175 millimeters long and 100 are more than 175 millimeters long. There are 11,576 brook trout per hectare, of which 11,076 are less than 175 millimeters long and 500 are more than 175 millimeters long.

A 1997 report stated that Crooked Run was an excellent site for angling.

See also
Cranberry Run, next tributary of Catawissa Creek going downstream
Tomhicken Creek, next tributary of Catawissa Creek going upstream
List of tributaries of Catawissa Creek

References

External links
Map of the Catawissa Creek watershed

Rivers of Schuylkill County, Pennsylvania
Tributaries of Catawissa Creek
Rivers of Pennsylvania